In Ireland, the two nations theory holds that Ulster Protestants form a distinct Irish nation. Advocated mainly by Unionists and loyalists, (but also supported by some Communist parties) who used it as a basis for opposing Home Rule and, later, to justify the partition of Ireland, it has been strongly criticised by Irish nationalists such as John Redmond (who stated that "'the two nation theory' is to us an abomination and a blasphemy"), Éamon de Valera, Seán Lemass and Douglas Gageby.

History 
According to S J Connolly's Oxford Companion to Irish History (p. 585), the two nations theory first appeared in the book Ulster As It Is (1896) by the Unionist Thomas Macknight. It was also advocated by the Tory writer W F Moneypenny in his 1913 book The Two Irish Nations: An Essay on Home Rule, and was later taken up by the British Conservative politician Bonar Law.

It was advanced in 1907 by the future Supreme Court judge and Sinn Féin Republican TD Arthur Clery in his book The Idea of a Nation. Clery appears to have been motivated by his view of Irishness as essentially Gaelic and Catholic, and by the belief that partition would facilitate the achievement of Home Rule. He is unusual in supporting the two nations theory from a nationalist perspective; it is more usually advocated by Unionists.

In 1962, the Dutch geographer Marcus Willem Heslinga (1922–2009) argued in his book The Irish Border as a Cultural Divide that there were good cultural reasons for the existence of the border. Paramount among these was religious difference which resulted in the partition of Ireland being a division between 'two nations' on the island of Ireland – the Catholic Irish nation in the Republic and the Protestant Ulster nation in Northern Ireland.

This view was also put forward by the Irish Communist Organisation (ICO) (later the British and Irish Communist Organisation (B&ICO)) in 1969, in response to the crisis in the North. On the basis of the Leninist theory of nationalities, they theorised that Ireland contained two overlapping nations and that it was necessary to recognise the rights of both. This led to their formation of the Workers' Association for the Democratic Settlement of the National Conflict in Ireland, in an attempt to draw the left to a non-nationalist position. Its policy sought the ending of the Republic's claim to Northern Ireland in Articles 2 and 3 of the Irish constitution. The ICO/B&ICO Two Nations idea is discussed in Ireland: Divided Nation, Divided Class by Austen Morgan and Bob Purdie. Jim Kemmy TD of the Democratic Socialist Party was influenced by these ideas.

Around the same time, the Irish nationalist Desmond Fennell put forward the idea that the Ulster Protestants were a separate ethnic group – the Ulster British – that had not been absorbed into the Irish nation, and the solution to the conflict was joint administration of Northern Ireland by the UK and Irish governments. Fennell put these ideas forward in articles for the Sunday Press and Irish Times; his 1973 pamphlet, "Towards a Greater Ulster", also outlines these ideas.

The ideas of Conor Cruise O'Brien about Northern Ireland, especially in his book States of Ireland (1973), were also labelled as "two nations theory" by some commentators.

In a 1971 speech, Tomás Mac Giolla of Official Sinn Féin condemned O'Brien, Fennell and B&ICO's "two nations theories" as a capitulation to "British imperialism".

In the mid-1970s, several members of the Vanguard Loyalist group also embraced
the Two-Nations Theory.

A variation on this idea was discussed by David Miller in his study of the Ulster Protestants, Queen's Rebels. He argued that Ulster Protestants, while not a nation, were a pre-nationalist group (separate from Irish Catholics) that operated according to loyalty to the
British Crown. He stated that there was thus a "nation" (Irish Catholic Nationalists) and a "community" (Irish Protestant Unionists) in Ireland.

In 2006, Jack Conrad, a member of the Communist Party of Great Britain (Provisional Central Committee) (CPGB-PCC), proposed in the Weekly Worker magazine that a solution to the Northern Ireland conflict would involve the recognition of the Ulster Protestants (who he called the "British-Irish"), and the solution he outlined was "We stand for a united Ireland, within which a one-county, four-half-county British-Irish province exercises self-determination" by retaining its separate status from the Republic of Ireland. Subsequently, some writers claimed Conrad was attempting to resurrect the Two-Nations Theory.

See also 
 Ulster nationalism
 Unionism in Ireland -- "The Ulster Option: 1905-1920", "Alternatives to Devolution", "The Defence of British-Unionist Culture", "Ulster-Scots and New Decade, New Approach".
 Partitionism
 Two Nation Theory (India)

References

External links 
 The Debate on the Irish National Question, by Robert Dorn
 How Many Nations are there in Ireland? by Michael Gallagher

Ulster nationalism
Unionism in Ireland